The Area Major Incident Pool (AMIP) is a defunct unit of Greater London's Metropolitan Police.

From 1985 to 2000, the Area Major Incident Pool consisted of experienced detectives available to assist divisional, station based CID detectives in the investigation of major crimes, such as non-domestic murders or those that crossed the boundaries of divisions.

In 1985, as part of then Commissioner's, Kenneth Newman's restructuring the 67 divisions of the Metropolitan Police District were divided among eight numbered geographical areas. Based at each Area headquarters were several specialist units, including AMIP and drugs squads, intended to decentralise some of the specialist units based at New Scotland Yard.

During 1992 the number of areas was reduced to five, being Central, North West, North East, South East and South West. In 1999 the areas were reduced to three (Central, North and South), with the AMIP teams being changed accordingly.

In 2000, as a result of the Macpherson Report which followed the death of Stephen Lawrence, area policing was discontinued in favour of borough policing, forming Borough Operational Command Units (BOCU).

Since 2000, much of AMIPs previous duties are performed by the Major Investigation Teams of the Specialist Crime Directorate.

Area Major Incident Pool (AMIP)